Siziano is a comune (municipality) in the Province of Pavia in the Italian region Lombardy, located about 15 km south of Milan and about 15 km north of Pavia.

Siziano borders the following municipalities: Bornasco, Carpiano, Lacchiarella, Landriano, Locate di Triulzi, Pieve Emanuele, Vidigulfo.

Demographic evolution

Transmitter 
At Siziano, there is a large mediumwave transmitter, which broadcasts Rai Radio 1 on 900 kHz with 600 kW. It is one of the most powerful transmitters in Italy and can be received in whole Europe at night time. As antenna two guyed mast radiators insulated against ground are used. They are 148 and 145 metres tall and situated at 45°19'54"N   9°11'59"E respectively 45°19'41"N   9°11'50"E.

References

Cities and towns in Lombardy